Susan Lenox (Her Fall and Rise) is a 1931 American pre-Code film directed and produced by Robert Z. Leonard and starring Greta Garbo and Clark Gable. The film was based on the novel by David Graham Phillips and made by Metro-Goldwyn-Mayer. It was the only film in which Greta Garbo was paired with Clark Gable. However, they didn't like each other. The notoriety of the novel alone was enough for British censors to ban it from release. With a few cuts, it was finally approved in the UK with a new title: The Rise of Helga.

Plot

Helga Ohlin (Greta Garbo) is an illegitimate child born and reared in an abusive home. Her uncle, Karl Ohlin (Jean Hersholt), arranges for her to marry a lout, Jeb Mondstrum (Alan Hale), but she runs away and meets Rodney Spencer (Clark Gable), an architect who is renting a cabin down the road from her family's farm. When Rodney leaves the cabin, her father and Jeb find her. She runs away again and hops onto a train that has just embarked.  She enters a room filled with a circus troupe. She joins them as a dancer, but writes letters to Spencer to meet her in Marquette; she now has been given the name of "Susan Lenox". While the police search for her on the train, the leader of the circus group, Wayne Burlingham (John Miljan), hides her in his quarters and then takes advantage of her. She meets Rodney in Marquette, but they have a misunderstanding because of her indiscretions with Burlingham, and he leaves. She runs away to New York and becomes the mistress of Mike Kelly (Hale Hamilton), a politician. At a dinner party at Kelly's penthouse, Mrs. Lenox invites Spencer, falsely concerning a new contract for him. He arrives not knowing the woman he is to meet, but they have another misunderstanding, and he once again leaves. Susan desperately goes to Spencer's home, but finds that he has left without telling where. She vows to search for him, and eventually she lands in Puerto Sacate of South America working as a dancer in a dance hall. There, she is romanced by an American, Robert Lane (Ian Keith), who arrives by yacht and wants to take her away with him and marry her. But, Susan yearns to meet with Spencer and vows to "rise or fall alone."  A barge with men working in the swamps arrive at the port, and a group of them, including Spencer, disembark and arrive at the dance hall.  Susan and Spencer meet, and after some arguing, they finally rekindle their relationship.

Cast (in credits order)
 Greta Garbo as Susan Lenox
 Clark Gable as Rodney Spencer
 Jean Hersholt as Karl Ohlin
 John Miljan as Wayne Burlingham
 Alan Hale as Jeb Mondstrum
 Hale Hamilton as Mike Kelly
 Hilda Vaughn as Astrid
 Russell Simpson as Doctor
 Cecil Cunningham as Madame Panoramia/Pansy
 Ian Keith as Robert Lane

Box office
According to MGM records the film made $806,000 in the U.S. and Canada and $700,000 elsewhere, resulting in a profit of $364,000.

References

External links
 
 
 

1931 films
American black-and-white films
Metro-Goldwyn-Mayer films
Films based on American novels
Films directed by Robert Z. Leonard
1931 drama films
Circus films
Films with screenplays by Wanda Tuchock
American drama films
1930s English-language films
1930s American films